Madelaine Böhme (born 1967) is a German palaeontologist and professor of palaeoclimatology at the University of Tübingen.

Böhme was born in 1967 in Plovdiv, Bulgaria. She studied at the Freiberg University of Mining and Technology and Leipzig University, completing her doctorate there in 1997 and habilitation at LMU Munich in 2003. In 2009 she became professor of terrestrial palaeoclimatology in Tübingen.

Work published in 2017 by a team including Böhme established that Graecopithecus freybergi fossils found in Greece were 7.2 million years old and the species was hominin.

In 2019, Böhme and her team were the first to describe Danuvius guggenmosi, an extinct species of great apes with adaptations for bipedalism that lived 11.6 million years ago.

In 2022, alongside Gerald Mayr and Thomas Lechner, Böhme described Allgoviachen tortonica, a new genus and species of anatid bird from the Hammerschmiede clay pits of Bavaria, Germany.

References

External links 

 
 
 

1967 births
Living people
German paleontologists
Academic staff of the University of Tübingen
German women scientists
Scientists from Plovdiv